Panteleyevo is a rural locality (a village) in Mayskoye Rural Settlement, Vologodsky District, Vologda Oblast, Russia. Its population was 4 in 2002.

Geography 
Panteleyevo is located 89 km northwest of Vologda (the district's administrative centre) by road. Kuzminskoye is the nearest rural locality.

References 

Rural localities in Vologodsky District